The 2004–2005 FedEx Express season was the third season of the franchise in the Philippine Basketball Association (PBA).

Draft picks

Occurrences
April 4, 2004: The Philippine team 20-and-under mentor Joe Lipa became the new head coach of FedEx, replacing Bonnie Garcia, PBA Commissioner Noli Eala set conditions that the veteran coach must severe his ties with the national team after the SEABA championships in September, or if coincides with the PBA, coach Joe Lipa must file a leave of absence from the FedEx ballclub.

Roster

Philippine Cup

Game log

|- bgcolor="#bbffbb"
| 1
| October 8
| Red Bull
| 102–95 
| Ferriols (21) 
| 
| 
| Makati Coliseum
| 1–0
|- bgcolor="#edbebf"
| 2
| October 13
| Talk 'N Text
| 98–119
| Ferriols (16)
| 
| 
| Araneta Coliseum
| 1–1
|- bgcolor="#bbffbb" 
| 3
| October 17
| Alaska
| 98–90
| Ritualo (23)
| 
| 
| Araneta Coliseum
| 2–1
|- bgcolor="#edbebf" 
| 4
| October 21
| Brgy.Ginebra
| 121–126
| 
| 
| 
| Dipolog
| 2–2
|- bgcolor="#edbebf" 
| 5
| October 27
| Coca Cola
| 67–84
| 
| 
| 
| Araneta Coliseum
| 2–3
|- bgcolor="#bbffbb" 
| 6
| October 29
| Purefoods
| 102–98 
| 
| 
| 
| Araneta Coliseum
| 3–3

|- bgcolor="#bbffbb" 
| 13
| December 1
| San Miguel
| 106–90
| Ritualo (19)
| 
| 
| Araneta Coliseum
| 5–8
|- bgcolor="#edbebf"
| 14
| December 9
| Alaska
| 102–114 
| 
| 
| 
| Urdaneta City
| 5–9
|- bgcolor="#bbffbb" 
| 15
| December 15
| Sta.Lucia
| 114–104
| Ritualo (24)
| 
| 
| Araneta Coliseum
| 6–9
|- bgcolor="#edbebf" 
| 16
| December 19
| Shell
| 85–90
| Ritualo (19)
| 
| 
| Makati Coliseum
| 6–10
|- bgcolor="#edbebf" 
| 17
| December 22
| Purefoods
| 110–112
| Ritualo (32)
| 
| 
| Philsports Arena
| 6–11

|- bgcolor="#edbebf"
| 18
| January 5
| Coca Cola
| 97–104
| Ritualo (25)
| 
| 
| Philsports Arena
| 6–12

Transactions

Trades

Additions

Subtractions

Recruited imports

GP – Games played

References

Fedex
Barako Bull Energy seasons